The 2014 Africa Cup was the fourteenth edition of the Africa Cup, an annual international rugby union tournament for African nations organised by the Confederation of African Rugby (CAR). The tournament, as well as the 2012 and 2013 editions of it, served as the qualifiers for the 2015 Rugby World Cup.

Changes from last season

Changes from the 2013 Africa Cup:
 Division 2 North was held as a Rugby Sevens tournament, while Division 2 South was played as a 15-a-side tournament.
 Division 3 is no longer on the programme. It was scheduled for 2013 however, due to economic and political instability, no games were played
  was promoted to Division 1A
  was relegated to Division 1B
  was promoted to Division 1B
  was relegated to Division 1C
  was added to Division 1C despite not competing last year, replacing , who will instead play in Division 2 North
  was scheduled to play in Division 3 Central in 2013, but was unable to. They will compete in the new Division 2 South tournament.

Division 1A

Division 1A was held between 26 June and 6 July 2014, at the Mahamasina Municipal Stadium in Antananarivo, Madagascar. The winner qualified for the 2015 Rugby World Cup as Africa 1, and the runner up qualified for the repechage. The competing teams were:

 
 
 
 

Numbers in parentheses are pre-tournament IRB rankings

Match Schedule

Division 1B

Division 1B was held between 9 and 14 June 2014, in Tunis, Tunisia. The competing teams were:

 
 
 
 

Semi-finals

3rd Place Playoff

Final

Division 1C

Division 1C was held between 14 and 21 June 2014, in Gaborone, Botswana.

 were initially supposed to play in Division 1C, but withdrew; they were replaced by South African club side, the 2014 SARU Community Cup champions Rustenburg Impala.

The competing teams were:

 
 
 
 
 
 
  Rustenburg Impala

Match Schedule

Division 2

Like in 2013, Division 2 is divided into North and South Groups. The North tournament was conducted under 7-a-side laws (similar to the 2012 tournament), while the South tournament was conducted under 15-a-side laws.

North

The North Group tournament was held in Ouagadougou, Burkina Faso on 17 and 18 May 2014. The competing teams were:

 
 
 
 
 
 

Match Schedule

Preliminary Games

5th Place Playoff

Semi-finals

3rd Place Playoff

Final

South

The South Group tournament was held in Kigali, Rwanda in between 3–7 June 2014. The competing teams were:

 
 
 

Only 11 Democratic Republic of the Congo players arrived for their match against Burundi. A match was played, with DRC winning 20-7. However, Burundi were awarded the match on forfeit, due to DRC only having 11 eligible players available.

See also
Africa Cup
2015 Rugby World Cup – Africa qualification
2015 Rugby World Cup – Repechage qualification

References

2014
2014 rugby union tournaments for national teams
2014 in African rugby union